Delta Force 3: The Killing Game is a 1991 American direct-to-video action film. It is the third and final film in The Delta Force film series. It is the only film in the series not to star Chuck Norris, although it does star his son Mike Norris.

Plot
Terrorist leader Kahlil Kadal has threatened to bomb Miami, Florida unless western influence is removed from the Middle East. In order to keep Kadal from detonating an atomic bomb in Miami, The Delta Force, with new leaders Charlie and Greg, are ordered to team up with a group of Russian Spetsnaz commandos and head to El-Qutar, Kadal's hometown in the fictional country of Sudalia, so they can hunt for Kadal.

Kadal sends Anwar Hussein to Miami, with orders to detonate the bomb live on TV, where Hussein arranges for an assault on TV news producer Wendy Jackson. Turning up in time to save her, Hussein chases off the attackers and uses the situation to become close to Wendy. With friction between Charlie and Sergei growing, the mission doesn't start well, losing a Soviet team member almost immediately. Eventually they locate and apprehend Kadal, but at a cost, Pietre and Sam are killed and Greg is wounded. They learn Kadal has already sent his suicide bomber, Richard and Irenia interrogate Kadal and learn of the bombers identity.

As Hussein uses Wendy to get into the audience of a TV show about immigration into the U.S. and has hidden the nuclear device in Wendy's wheelchair. Charlie and Sergei arrive with Kadal just as Hussein has made his move, Kadal orders Hussein not to detonate the bomb while Sergei throws his knife from the balcony, Hussein shoots Kadal dead. Charlie catches the knife on the TV stage and drives it through Hussein's foot that is pressing on the bombs trigger. With Hussein unable to release the trigger, Sergei shoots him between the eyes. Charlie looks up at Sergei and says "nice throw", Sergei replies "nice catch" and the pair smile at each other in their newly found respect for each other.

Cast

 Nick Cassavetes as Major Charlie Stewart, commander of the Delta team
 Matthew Penn as Lieutenant Richard O'Keefe, Delta Force's intelligence officer
 Mike Norris as Greg Lassiter, Delta Force point man
 Eric Douglas as Sam, Delta Force explosives expert
 Sandy Ward as General Wilson, JSOC commander
 John Ryan as Captain Sergei Ilyich Leskov, commander of Soviet Spetsnaz team
 Hana Azoulay Hasfari as Irenia Usuri, Soviet intelligence officer
 Mark Ivanir as Pietre Ivanovich, Soviet explosives expert
 Gregory Tal as Bruk, Soviet heavy weapons specialist
 Candace Brecker as Wendy Jackson, a TV news producer
 Jonathan Cherchi as Kahlil Kadal, Sadalian terrorist leader
 Dan Turgeman as Anwar Hussein, Sadalian suicide bomber

Reception

Critical response
Entertainment Weekly rated it a 'C', saying "the mission is impossibly farfetched, the action stiffly staged, and the second-generation stars poor substitutes for their famous dads."

References

External links

1991 films
1991 action films
American action films
Direct-to-video sequel films
Films directed by Sam Firstenberg
Films about Delta Force
Films shot in Israel
Golan-Globus films
1990s English-language films
Films produced by Boaz Davidson
Films with screenplays by Boaz Davidson
1990s American films